Cowherd may refer to:

Worker
Cowboy, an American who herds cattle on horseback
Cowman (profession) in the UK, akin to ranch hand or dairy worker in North America
pastoral farming who works with cattle; also known as pastoralist
Stockman (Australia), who works with cattle

People
The Cowherd, the male protagonist of the Chinese story "The Cowherd and the Weaver Girl"
Colin Cowherd (born 1964), American sports radio host
Kevin Cowherd, American author
Thomas Cowherd (1817–1907), Canadian tinsmith and poet
William Cowherd (1763–1816), English clergyman
William S. Cowherd (1860–1915), American mayor of Kansas City and U.S. congressman for Missouri
Leonard Cowherd

See also
Coward (disambiguation)